The Mandela Way T-34 Tank, nicknamed Stompie, is a decommissioned Soviet-built T-34-85 medium tank, which used to be located on the corner of Mandela Way and Page's Walk in Bermondsey, London, England. The tank was regularly repainted in a wide variety of colour schemes, often by graffiti artists. In January 2022 it was temporarily removed for restoration.

History
The tank is a former Czechoslovak People's Army tank that is said to have taken part in the suppression of the Prague Spring uprising in 1968. Following the "Velvet Revolution" and the dissolution of Czechoslovakia, it was decommissioned and sold, and was used as a prop in the making of the 1995 film Richard III in London. On completion of the film, it was bought in 1995 by Russell Gray, a local scrap dealer, for £7,000 as a present for his son. He had previously failed to secure planning permission from Southwark Council to redevelop a vacant plot of land that he owned; and so, in an act of humorous protest, he placed the tank on the site, with its gun turret turned towards the council offices. He had previously allegedly obtained permission for the installation of a "tank" there, assumed by council officials to mean a septic tank.

The tank is nicknamed after the South African anti-apartheid activist James "Stompie" Seipei.

It was removed for restoration by its owner, on 4 January 2022, who said that "it might be a week, it might be two years".

Repainting
The tank is regularly repainted, and its colour scheme changed, often by local graffiti artists. In 2002 it was painted pink by Cubitt Artists and Aleksandra Mir. In April 2017 it was temporarily repainted by artist Charlotte Meldon to its authentic military olive drab. In April 2020, during the coronavirus pandemic, it was painted sky blue in support of the National Health Service. Remembrance poppies were added in November 2020. In July 2021, it was repainted light green with dark green letters reading "Go Go Green".

Gallery

Similar graffitied tanks

There are also T-64 and T-72 tanks that have been graffitied in a hippie manner at the National Museum of the History of Ukraine in the Second World War, Kyiv, Ukraine.

The Monument to Soviet tank crews was a memorial located in Prague, Czech Republic, made up of an IS-2m tank on a pedestal. In 1991, the artist David Cerny painted the tank pink and hoisted a large middle finger over the turret in protest against the controversial monument. The monument was later removed and the tank is now displayed at Military Museum Lešany, painted pink.

References

External links

 

1995 establishments in England
2002 sculptures
Individual tanks
Tourist attractions in the London Borough of Southwark
Bermondsey
Graffiti in England